The 1960 Indiana State Sycamores football team represented Indiana State University as a member of the Indiana Collegiate Conference ICC) during the 1960  NCAA College Division football season. Led by fourth-year head coach Bill Jones, the Sycamores compiled and overall record of 3–4 with a mark of 3–3 in conference play, placing fourth in the ICC. Indiana State played home games at Memorial Stadium in Terre Haute, Indiana.

Schedule

References

Indiana State
Indiana State Sycamores football seasons
Indiana State Sycamores football